James Goethe Ward (1896-1928) was an Australian rugby league and rugby union footballer who played in the 1910s and 1920s.

Career
Ward, who was employed at the Weather Bureau, began his football career with the Randwick Rugby Union team.

Later he played Rugby League with North Sydney (1919-1920), and University (1921-22, 1926-27) in which he played in the 1926 Grand Final.

Death
Ward died at Katoomba on 17 March 1928.

References

Australian rugby league players
Sydney University rugby league team players
1896 births
1928 deaths
North Sydney Bears players
Rugby league locks
Rugby league wingers
Rugby league centres
Rugby league second-rows